In fashion, the midriff is the human abdomen. The midriff is exposed when wearing a crop top or some forms of swimwear or underwear.

Etymology 
"Midriff" is a very old term in the English language, coming into use before 1000 AD.

In Old English it was written as "midhrif", with the old word "hrif" literally meaning stomach; in Middle English it was "mydryf". The word fell into obsolescence after the 18th century.

The word was revived in 1941 by the fashion industry, partly to avoid use of the word "belly" which genteel women considered undesirable in reference to their bodies, as it has connotations of obesity.

In addition, "belly" was a word which was forbidden to be used in films by the Hays Office censors; for instance, in the 1933 film 42nd Street, in the song Shuffle Off to Buffalo, Ginger Rogers is about to sing the line "with a shotgun at his belly", but stops after the "B" of "belly" and sings "tummy" instead.)

Culture and history

Western culture

1930s–1970s 

In some cultures, exposure of the midriff is socially discouraged or even banned, and the Western culture has historically been hesitant in the use of midriff-baring styles. Bill Blass commented:

It is too difficult. Women will much more readily wear bare-back or plunging-neckline styles. 

It was introduced to fashion in 1932 by Madeleine Vionnet when she offered an evening gown with strategically cut openings at the waist.

Women's swimwear of  the 1930s and 1940s incorporated increasing degrees of midriff exposure.

Teen magazines of late 1940s and 1950s featured similar designs of midriff-baring suits and tops. However, midriff fashion was stated as only for beaches and informal events and considered indecent to be worn in other public situations.

However, exposure of the female midriff and navel was widely brought into everyday Western women's fashion in the 1960s' sexual revolution and later with the popularity of halters, tube tops and crop tops in the 1970s.

The cheerleading style fashions developing largely from the styles originating with the Dallas Cowboys Cheerleaders in the early 1970s also played a crucial role for the popularity of midriff fashion at middle and high schools.

1980s–1990s 
During the 1980s, pop star Madonna appeared in bare midriff looks in her performances and music videos, which helped in spreading this fashion widely.

The popularity of the bare midriff continued well due to low-rise fashion which started in the early 1990s when the British magazine The Face in its March 1993 issue cover featured Kate Moss in low-rise jeans. At the same time, the wide acceptance of navel display in Western societies, navel piercing and navel tattoos have become more common among young women. This raised the popularity of crop tops that expose the midriff and navel.

During the 1990s, many designers adapted to the trend. One way of showing the midriff that has proved popular with designers is simply fastening a jacket or vest at the neckline and letting it fall freely. When the wearer moves there is a flash of skin, but nothing startling. Fashion designer Carolina Herrera told:

the midriff doesn't have to be completely bare; a veil of chiffon over the midriff can look intriguing.

2000s–2010s 
The bare midriff, with flat, toned abs, became the trend in Hollywood in the 2000s. In the Spring-Summer 2015 Haute Couture show by Chanel in Paris, midriff-baring tops were a main focus.

In US schools 
Beginning in the late 1940s, school dress codes in the United States started to ban bare midriffs.

Some American secondary schools have dress codes dating back to the 1970s against attire that leaves the midriff exposed. An example of a test that some schools apply is to have the student raise her arms if her shirt just barely covers her midriff while her arms are down. If during this test the girl's navel is exposed as she raises her arms, then she will be prohibited from wearing that shirt to school anymore.

As an example, the dress code of the Sherman Independent School District in Texas requires that "there must be no exposure of the midriff area or undergarments. The midriff area must not be seen while bending over, while standing, raising arms, and stretching."

In 2002, East Valley High School in Spokane Valley, Washington specified guidelines about inappropriate clothing in the school's student planner and handbook which includes "clothing that reveals the midriff".

In 2004, the Board of Education of Meriden, Connecticut, brought a dress code that banned shirts, blouses that expose the top of the shoulders, haltertops, spaghetti tops, and any clothing that exposed the waist, midriff or hips.

Indian culture 

Indian women have traditionally worn saris that partially cover the midriff, especially South Indian women.

One of the styles of saris is bare midriff. The gap on the midriff between sari and the choli presented the elegance of a woman's body and suggests a feminine strength.

It also makes them look attractive, is sometimes used in Indian traditional dance as it allows a flexible movement.

Both men and women have bare midriff while performing the classical dance. It has also become a part of Bollywood culture.

A less likely cultural explanation could be that in ancient Indian scriptures, the navel of the god Vishnu the Protector is considered to be the center of the universe and the source of life. From his navel a new world of the future emerges. A woman is considered as creator of life and source of Shakti, hence the bare midriff also symbolizes free flow of cosmic energy.

This has been depicted in many ancient Indian sculptures as a lotus emerging from the navel on which God Brahma the Creator is seated. Due to this the midriff is set to be left bare in a sari.

Another more practical reason could be the hot tropical climate of India. Rathi Vinay Jha, director general of the Fashion Design Council of India told:

The bare midriff keeps you cool

The sari adapts to a woman's body, rather than defining it, allowing for pregnancy and otherwise expanding girth. In a culture where having enough to eat is not a given, rolls of fat around the midriff are a sign of prestige, rather than indulgence. Torsekar, a paediatrician from India who works in Toledo, Ohio, once told, "It may be hard for American women to imagine going to work with an exposed midriff, but for Indian women, the midriff is considered no more suggestive than the forearm."

Other Indian communities that take midriff in their stride include the women from Rajasthan who leave the midriff exposed while wearing ghagra cholis. However, these women often cover their heads with a Dupatta and even cover their faces in front of strangers, which enforces the belief that midriff-baring in India has a symbolic, almost mystical, association with birth and life and that the display is meant to emphasise the centrality of nature in the nurture role.

In spite of it, some Indian philosophers gave opposition to exposing midriff in saris. They considered it to be a symbol of adultery.

The only ornament accepted by the Hindu culture that can be worn in the midriff region are the waist chains. They are considered to be a part of bridal jewellery.

Due to modern fashion trends, along with saris, the midriff-revealing ghaghra cholis are also popular. Designer Manish Malhotra's Fashion Week collections regularly highlight low waisted ghaghras accompanied by short cholis.

Such ghagra cholis are more commonly worn by the Bollywood celebrities in films as well as in real life. For example, actress Malaika Arora Khan featured in midriff revealing ghagra choli without dupatta for the hit songs "Chaiyya Chaiyya" in Dil Se.. (1998) and "Munni Badnaam Hui" in Dabangg (2010).

Actress Priyanka Chopra featured in a low rise ghagra choli designed by designer Ritu Kumar on the opening show of the HDIL India Couture Week 2008 held in Mumbai.

At the Blenders Pride Fashion Tour 2011, she featured in a low rise ghagra choli designed by Neeta Lulla.

Recently, actress Amisha Patel walked the ramp in a low rise green ghagra choli designed by Rocky S at Aamby Valley City India Bridal Week 2011.

See also 
Abdominal obesity
Alvinolagnia
Belly dance
Crop top
Navel in popular culture
Waist
Waist–hip ratio
Waistline (clothing)

References

Further reading 
 

Abdomen
Human appearance